Psilocybe brasiliensis is a species of psilocybin mushroom in the family Hymenogastraceae. Found in Brazil, it was described as new to science in 1978 by Mexican mycologist Gastón Guzmán.

See also
List of Psilocybe species
List of psilocybin mushrooms

References

External links

Entheogens
Fungi described in 1978
Psychoactive fungi
brasiliensis
Psychedelic tryptamine carriers
Fungi of South America
Taxa named by Gastón Guzmán